Kurt Michael Campbell,  (born August 27, 1957) is an American diplomat and businessman, who formerly served as Assistant Secretary of State for East Asian and Pacific Affairs in the Obama administration. He is the chairman and CEO of The Asia Group, LLC, which he founded in February 2013.

Campbell was appointed White House "Asia co-ordinator" or "Asia Tsar" on the first day of the Biden administration, with the official title of National Security Council Coordinator for the Indo-Pacific.

Education 
Kurt Michael Campbell was born on August 27, 1957. He received a B.A. from the University of California, San Diego, a certificate in music and political philosophy from the University of Yerevan in Soviet Armenia, and a doctorate in international relations from Brasenose College, Oxford, on a Marshall Scholarship.

Career
Campbell served in several capacities in government, including as Deputy Assistant Secretary of Defense for Asia and the Pacific, Director on the National Security Council Staff, Deputy Special Counselor to the President for the North American Free Trade Agreement (NAFTA), and as a White House fellow at the United States Department of the Treasury.

Campbell served as an officer in the U.S. Navy on the Joint Chiefs of Staff and in the Chief of Naval Operations Special Intelligence Unit. He was also associate professor of public policy and international relations at the John F. Kennedy School of Government and Assistant Director of the Center for Science and International Affairs at Harvard University.

Campbell was hired at the Center for Strategic and International Studies think-tank as one of its senior vice-presidents, as director of its International Security Program, and as its Henry A. Kissinger Chair in National Security Policy.

Campbell went on to become the chief executive officer and co-founder of the Center for a New American Security (CNAS), a national security think tank launched in January 2007.

On June 26, 2009, Campbell was confirmed by the Obama administration as Assistant Secretary of State for East Asian and Pacific Affairs. His last day in office was February 8, 2013.

Campbell also served as director of the Aspen Strategy Group and the chairman of the editorial board of the Washington Quarterly, and was the founder and principal of StratAsia, a strategic advisory company focused on Asia.

Campbell is a member of the Council on Foreign Relations, the Wasatch Group, and the International Institute for Strategic Studies.

In 2018-2019, Campbell was Kissinger Fellow at the McCain Institute for International Leadership.

Campbell was appointed "Asia co-ordinator" or "Asia Tsar" on the first day of the Biden administration.

Publications

As author
The Pivot: The Future of American Statecraft in Asia, Kurt M. Campbell, (NYC: Twelve, 2016) 
Difficult Transitions: Foreign Policy Troubles at the Outset of Presidential Power, Kurt M. Campbell and James B. Steinberg, (Washington, D.C.: Brookings, 2008)
Hard Power: The New Politics of National Security, Kurt M. Campbell and Michael E. O'Hanlon, (Washington, D.C.: Basic Books, 2006)
To Prevail: An American Strategy for the Campaign against Terrorism, Kurt M. Campbell and Michèle Flournoy, Principal Authors, Center for Strategic and International Studies (Washington, D.C.: CSIS Press, 2001)

As editor 
 Mentioned in Is this what the World is Coming to? (Nature.com)
The Nuclear Tipping Point, Kurt M. Campbell, Robert J. Einhorn, Mitchell B. Reiss, eds., (Washington, D.C.: Brookings, 2004)

As opinionist
 At the outset of his influence on the Biden administration, he saw the D10 club of countries as "most urgent for questions of trade, technology, supply chains, and standards", and militarily sought to expand "the so-called Quad".

Honors and awards
Campbell received the Department of Defense Medals for Distinguished Public Service and for Outstanding Public Service.

Campbell co-chaired the executive committee of the 9-11 Pentagon Memorial Fund.

On 25 November 2013, Campbell was appointed an Honorary Officer of the Order of Australia (AO) For service to strengthening bilateral relations between Australia and the United States of America. In the 2014 New Year Honours, Campbell was appointed an honorary Companion of the New Zealand Order of Merit for services to New Zealand-United States relations. On 15 October 2013, Campbell was appointed Order of Brilliant Star with Special Grand Cordon for services to Taiwan-United States relations.

References

External links

State Department biography
Kurt Campbell's bio on CNAS website
Belfer Center Alums Launch Center for New American Strategy [sic]

1957 births
Alumni of Brasenose College, Oxford
Assistant Secretaries of State for East Asian and Pacific Affairs
Biden administration personnel
Center for a New American Security
Honorary Companions of the New Zealand Order of Merit
Honorary Officers of the Order of Australia
International relations scholars
Harvard Kennedy School faculty
Living people
Lixil Group people
Marshall Scholars
University of California, San Diego alumni
Yerevan State University alumni